Leonard Katzman (September 2, 1927 – September 5, 1996) was an American film and television producer, writer and director. He was most notable for being the showrunner of the CBS oil soap opera Dallas.

Early life and career
Leonard Katzman was born in New York City on September 2, 1927, to a Jewish family. He began his career in the 1940s, while still in his teens, working as an assistant director for his uncle, Hollywood producer Sam Katzman. He started out on adventure movie serials such as Brenda Starr, Reporter (1945), Superman (1948), Batman and Robin (1949), The Great Adventures of Captain Kidd (1951), Riding with Buffalo Bill (1954), et al. During the 1950s he continued working as assistant director, mostly with his uncle, in feature films such as A Yank in Korea (1951), The Giant Claw (1957), Face of a Fugitive (1959) and Angel Baby (1961). Besides his big screen work, Katzman also served on television shows, including The Adventures of Wild Bill Hickok, The Mickey Rooney Show and Bat Masterson.

In 1960, Katzman made his production debut, serving not only as assistant director, but also as associate producer, on all four seasons of adventure drama Route 66 (1960-1964), which he would later regard as his favorite production. His additional early work in television production (and occasional writing and directing) includes shows crime drama Tallahassee 7000 (1961), western drama The Wild Wild West (1965-1969), the second season of crime drama Hawaii Five-O (1969-1970), legal drama Storefront Lawyers (1970-1971), the final five seasons of western drama Gunsmoke (1970-1975) as well as its spinoff series Dirty Sally (1974), legal drama Petrocelli (1974-1976) for which he was nominated an Edgar Allan Poe Award, and the two science fiction dramas The Fantastic Journey (1977) and Logan's Run (1977-1978). In 1965, he wrote, produced and directed the science fiction film Space Probe Taurus (also known as Space Monster). Aside from his work as assistant director, this was his only venture into feature films.

Dallas
In 1978, Katzman served as producer for the five-part miniseries Dallas, which would evolve into one of television's longest running dramas, lasting until 1991. While the series was created by David Jacobs, Katzman became the de facto show runner during the second season of the show, as Jacobs stepped down to create and later run Dallas spin-off series Knots Landing. Under Katzman's lead, Dallas, whose first episodes had consisted of self-contained stories, evolved into a serial, leading into the '80s trend of prime time soap operas.

While Katzman headed Dallas''' writing staff from the show's second season, he remained producer, with Philip Capice serving as executive producer. The creative conflicts between Capice and Katzman eventually led to Katzman stepping down from his production duties on the show for season nine, instead being billed as "creative consultant" (during this time he also worked on the short-lived drama series Our Family Honor). However, increased production costs and decreasing ratings caused production company Lorimar—along with series star Larry Hagman (J. R. Ewing)—to ask Katzman to return to the show in his old capacity. Katzman agreed, reportedly under the condition that he would have "total authority" on the show, and as of the tenth season premiere he was promoted to executive producer, and Capice was let go.

Katzman remained as executive producer on Dallas until the series finale in May 1991. Besides his production work, he also wrote and directed more episodes of the series than anyone else.

After Dallas
Following "Dallas", Katzman went on to create the short-lived crime drama Dangerous Curves (1992-1993), which aired as a part of CBS' late-night drama block Crimetime After Primetime, and serve as executive producer for the second season of the action drama Walker, Texas Ranger (1994-1995). His last work was the 1996 "Dallas" reunion movie J.R. Returns, which he also wrote and directed.

Personal life and death
Katzman fathered his first child, Gary Katzman, with Eileen Leener (1929-2019). Katzman did not raise his first child and left his mother when he was 4 years old. The child was eventually adopted and took the surname Klein. Through Gary Klein, Katzman is the biological grandfather of Ethan Klein of the Israeli-American YouTube comedy channel h3h3Productions.

Leonard Katzman and his wife LaRue Farlow Katzman  had three children. His daughter, actress Sherril Lynn Rettino (1956-1995), predeceased her father by one year. She played the recurring character Jackie Dugan on Dallas from 1979-91. His sons Mitchell Wayne Katzman and Frank Katzman, as well as son-in-law John Rettino, all worked on the production of Dallas' later seasons. Both sons were also involved in the production of Dangerous Curves; Walker, Texas Ranger; and J. R. Returns.

Katzman died of a heart attack in Malibu, California on September 5, 1996, three days after his 69th birthday, and more than two months prior to the airing of his last production, Dallas: J.R. Returns''. He was interred in the Mount Sinai Memorial Park Cemetery in Los Angeles.

Filmography
Excluding work as assistant director.

Awards
1997: Lone Star Film & Television Awards - Special Award

References

External links

1927 births
1996 deaths
American television directors
American television writers
American male television writers
Television producers from New York City
Burials at Mount Sinai Memorial Park Cemetery
20th-century American businesspeople
Jewish American writers
Screenwriters from New York (state)
20th-century American screenwriters
20th-century American male writers
20th-century American Jews